Néouvielle National Nature Reserve is a  national nature reserve located in the Néouvielle massif. With a wide array of flora and fauna, it contains about 370 animal species and 570 breeds of algae.

Geography 
Located in the French Pyrénées (Midi-Pyrénées region, Hautes-Pyrénées department, near Saint-Lary-Soulan and Barèges in the Néouvielle massif), the reserve lies to the east of the Pyrenees National Park. It lies in the municipal territories of Vielle-Aure (enclave), Saint-Lary-Soulan (enclave) and Aragnouet.
It is bordered to the west by the Néouvielle massif, to the south by the Cap-de-Long and Orédon lakes, to the east by the lac de l'Oule and to the north by the col de Barèges. It includes the lakes of Aubert and Aumar.
The reserve is in the lee of summits ranging from the pic de la Munia to the Arbizon massif and is generally exposed southwards, which induces a hotter and drier microclimate allowing a life limit extension.

It is mostly made up of rich pine forests and of 70 lakes and laquettes.
Still today, sheep and cattle rearing continues to maintain pastures as well as the balance between lawn, heath and pinewood. Hence pastoralism, a multi secular tradition, is a factor of ecological diversity.

Environment 
The forests of the Néouvielle massif are arranged in thickets of (mountain pine), the remaining space consists of rhododendrons and lawn.
The vegetation hosts a wide array of fauna with many emblematic breeds like the alpine marmot, the heather cock, the red crossbill, the golden eagle, the griffon, the egyptian vulture, le red kite, the bearded vulture as well as endemical animals: Pyrenean desman, Pyrenean brook salamander and isard.

There are many water environments, allowing a wide biological diversity with 571 breeds of algae as well as two thirds of French sphagnums.

References 

Nature reserves in France
Geography of Hautes-Pyrénées